Tatineni (Telugu: తాతినేని) is one of the Indian surnames.

 Tatineni Chalapati Rao, famous Music Director of Telugu cinema.
 Tatineni Prakash Rao, famous Director of Telugu cinema.
 Tatineni Rama Rao, famous Director of Telugu cinema.

Indian surnames